Skid Row is an American heavy metal band from Toms River, New Jersey. Formed in 1986, the group originally included bassist Rachel Bolan, lead guitarist Dave "The Snake" Sabo, lead vocalist Matt Fallon, drummer John Ratkowski Jr., and rhythm guitarist Jim Yuhas. By early 1987, the lineup had changed to feature Sebastian Bach in place of Fallon, Scotti Hill in place of Yuhas and Rob Affuso in place of Ratkowski. After releasing three studio albums together, Skid Row began an unofficial hiatus in August 1996. Bach left the band in December, claiming that Sabo and Bolan had fired him. The group's remaining members formed Ozone Monday with vocalist Sean McCabe in 1998.

In January 1999, Sabo, Bolan and Hill reformed Skid Row, later adding new vocalist Johnny Solinger and drummer Charlie Mills. In July 2000, it was announced that Phil Varone had replaced Mills, who was forced to leave the band due to "lack of income". The new drummer performed on the group's first studio album in over eight years, 2003's Thickskin, but in January 2004 left "abruptly" due to "personal reasons", with Timothy DiDuro taking his place. Varone had rejoined by March, but within two months had left again, with Dave Gara joining as his replacement. Gara remained in the band until April 2010, with Rob Hammersmith taking his place in May.

After more than 15 years with the band, Solinger left Skid Row in April 2015, reportedly in order to focus on his solo career. Sabo and Bolan later disputed that Solinger had left the band of his own accord, claiming that they had instead fired him. Despite rumours of a reunion with Bach, Solinger was replaced by former TNT frontman Tony Harnell. His tenure was short-lived, however, and by the end of the year he had departed after claiming that the other band members "ignored and disrespected" him. Early the following year, Skid Row began touring with former DragonForce frontman ZP Theart, who was made an official member of the band in January 2017. Theart remained until March 2022, when he was replaced by Erik Grönwall.

Members

Current

Former

Other former members
 Cody Howell – bass (1986)
 Steve Brotherton – guitar (1986, 2005)
 Kurtis Jackson – guitar (1986, 2005)
 Sean McCabe (Shawn Mars) – lead vocals (1997–1998)

Touring substitutes
 Rick Marty – guitar (1994)
 Keri Kelli – guitar (2005, 2008)
 Ryan Cook – guitar (2007, 2012)
 Alex Grossi – guitar (2008)
 Johny Dey – guitar (2015)

Touring guests
 Rob Halford – vocals (1993, 1995)

Session members
 Taime Downe – vocals on "Psycho Therapy" from B-Side Ourselves (1992)
 Rob Halford – vocals on "Delivering the Goods" from B-Side Ourselves (1992) and Subhuman Beings on Tour (1995)

Timeline

Lineups

References

External links
Skid Row official website

Skid Row